Tim Jordan (born June 15, 1984) of Plainfield, CT, is a race car driver in the NASCAR Whelen All-American Series.

Career
Jordan began racing at the age of 17 in Mini Stocks at the rainbow Speedbowl. He raced from 2002 to 2004, earning Rookie of the Year in 2002, and second overall in points in 2003 and 2004. He won a division-leading five races in 2004. In 2005, Jordan took a season off so his race team, Jordan Racing (owned by Patrick and Debra Jordan, Jordan's parents), could financially prepare for moving up to Late Models in 2006. 

Jordan, a 2006 rookie, won his first race in his fifth career start. In 2006, he won seven races, had 14 top-five finishes and 16 top-ten finishes in 19 races. He won Rookie of the Year and the divisional championship. He was the first rookie Late Model driver in the division's 35-year history to win a Track Championship. In a scaled back 2007 season, Jordan won five races in 17 starts at Waterford. In 2008, Jordan finished second overall in points with three wins, 16 top-five finishes and 19 top-ten finishes in 20 events.

Jordan would continue racing Late Models full-time at the Waterford Speedbowl in 2009.

Personal life
Jordan is a third-generation racer. His grandfather, Ron "Sly" Fox, raced in the late 1970s at Waterford in Super Stocks and Modifieds. His uncle, Tom Fox, has raced in Late Models, Modifieds, the Busch Grand National East Series, and the Whelen Modified Tour.

Jordan graduated from Eastern Connecticut State University in May 2006 with a Bachelor of Arts in Digital Art and Design. He currently works as a graphic designer.

External links
The Official Tim Jordan Website

1984 births
Living people
People from Plainfield, Connecticut
American graphic designers
NASCAR drivers
Racing drivers from Connecticut